The 2014–15 Rice Owls women's basketball team represents Rice University during the 2014–15 NCAA Division I women's basketball season. The Owls, led by ninth year head coach Greg Williams, play their home games at the Tudor Fieldhouse and are members of Conference USA. They finished the season 9–21, 4–14 in C-USA play to finish in a tie for twelfth place. They lost in the first round of the C-USA women's tournament to Old Dominion in the 9th inning.

Roster

Rankings

Schedule

|-
!colspan=9 style="background:#002469; color:#5e6062;"| Non-Conference Regular Season

|-
!colspan=9 style="background:#002469; color:#5e6062;"| C-USA Regular Season

|-
!colspan=9 style="background:#002469; color:#5e6062;"|Conference USA Women's Tournament

See also
2014–15 Rice Owls men's basketball team

References

Rice Owls women's basketball seasons
Rice